NYHS may refer to:

New-York Historical Society, an American history museum and library
New York Harbor School, a public high school in New York City
Northwest Yeshiva High School, a Jewish high school in Mercer Island, Washington